Sullivan Knoll is a lone nunatak midway between the Marty Nunataks and the Raven Mountains in the Britannia Range. It was named after Paul J. Sullivan, an electronics technician in support of the U.S. Antarctic Program at McMurdo Station.

Mountains of Oates Land